Reha may refer to:


People

Given name
Reha Denemeç (born 1961), Turkish politician
Reha Eken (1925–2013), Turkish footballer
Reha Erdem (born 1960), Turkish film director and screenwriter
Reha Erginer (born 1970), Turkish football player and coach
Reha Kapsal (born 1963), Turkish football manager
Reha Kutlu (born 1945), Turkish-French producer and journalist
Reha Muhtar (born 1959), Turkish journalist
Reha Oğuz Türkkan (1920–2010), Turkish writer
Reha Özcan (born 1965), Turkish actor
 Řehá, Czech-language diminutive of Řehoř

Surname
Gabi Reha (born 1964), German swimmer

Other
Reha Mota, a village in Bhuj Taluka, Kutch district, India

See also

Recha (disambiguation)
Rekha (disambiguation)